Litija is a town in the Litija Basin in central Slovenia. It is the seat of the Municipality of Litija. It is located in the valley of the Sava River, east of the capital Ljubljana, in the traditional region of Upper Carniola. The entire municipality is now included in the Central Sava Statistical Region; until January 2014 it was part of the Central Slovenia Statistical Region. The town is home to about 6,500 people.

Name
Litija was mentioned in written documents in 1256 as apud Litigiam and apud Lvtyam (and as Lutya in 1363, Littai in 1431, Luttey in 1444, and propre Lutiam in 1480). Medieval transcriptions indicate that the name was originally *Ljutija, derived from *Ľutoviďa (vьsь) (literally, 'Ľutovidъ's village'). Suggestions that -ija is a suffix or that the name is derived from German Lutte '(mining) drain' are less likely. Other pseudoetymologies include Johann Weikhard von Valvasor's suggestion that the name evolved from litus, the Latin word for 'riverbank'. The town was officially known as Littai in German until 1918.

History
Litija developed as a trading post between Trieste, Ljubljana, and Croatia. The town gained market rights in the 14th century. In Roman times mining developed in Litija and remained one of the primary sources of income until the 1965, when the biggest of the mines closed. In 1849 the Austrian Southern Railway reached Litija and boosted its economy. This development, however, also meant a decline in some of the traditional local professions. The Litija post office was opened in December 1852. After the Second World War, Litija annexed the formerly independent settlements of Podsitarjevec, Gradec, Grbin, and Podkraj.

Landmarks

The parish church in the settlement is dedicated to Saint Nicholas and belongs to the Roman Catholic Archdiocese of Ljubljana. The current building was built in 1884 and extended in 1997.

Notable people
Notable people that were born or lived in Litija include:
France Bezlaj (1910–1993), linguist
Luka Svetec (1826–1921), politician
Peter Jereb (1867–1951), composer
Viktor Parma (1858–1924), composer
Rudolf Badjura (1881–1963), writer and mountaineer
Mira Pregelj (1905–1966), painter
Milan Borišek (1920–1950), glider pilot

Gallery

References

External links

 Litija on Geopedia

Populated places in the Municipality of Litija
Cities and towns in Upper Carniola